The Podkamennaya Tunguska (literally Tunguska under the stones; , Ket: Ӄо’ль) also known as Middle Tunguska or Stony Tunguska, is a river in Krasnoyarsk Krai, Russian Federation.

History
In 1908, an asteroid impacted near the river and later became known as the Tunguska event.

In popular culture
The river was the set location in the Call of Duty: Black Ops Escalation DLC map, Call of The Dead.

See also
List of rivers of Russia

References

External links

Rivers of Krasnoyarsk Krai